Hanover Airport may refer to:

Hannover-Langenhagen Airport in Hanover, Germany (IATA: HAJ, ICAO: EDDV)
Hanover County Municipal Airport in Hanover County, Virginia, United States (FAA: OFP; ICAO: KOFP)
Hanover Airport (Pennsylvania) in Hanover, Pennsylvania, United States (FAA: 6W6)
Hanover Saugeen Airport, in Hanover, Ontario (CPN4)